Courcôme is a commune in the Charente department in southwestern France. On 1 January 2019, the former communes of Tuzie and Villegats were merged into Courcôme.

Population

See also
Communes of the Charente department

References

Communes of Charente

Communes nouvelles of Charente